The 1919 Lübeck state election was held on 9 February 1919 to elect the 80 members of the Bürgerschaft, the state parliament of the Free and Hanseatic City of Lübeck.

Results

References 

Lübeck
Elections in Schleswig-Holstein